Op Zop Too Wah is the tenth solo album by Adrian Belew. The original title was On with a close-up of an on/off switch as the cover. However, Belew noticed an English band, Echobelly, had released an album with the same title. Op Zop Too Wah comes from a series of nonsensical words Belew invented in high school with his friend, Mike Wilshire.

Following the indifferent reception given to Belew's previous album (the experimental The Guitar As Orchestra), Op Zop Too Wah is a return to more traditional songwriting. The album's mood is reminiscent of the more avant-garde approach carried out by The Beatles in the late 1960s on albums such as Sgt. Pepper's Lonely Hearts Club Band. "I Remember How To Forget" was originally recorded with King Crimson in 1994, but never released.

Reviews 

Musician (12/96, pp. 89–91):
"...his best overall `pop' album yet....besides the usual winning, Beatles-inflected rockers...and craftily melodic ballads...there are also strong hints of Belew's non-pop output....the bruising riffs of `I Remember How To Forget' recall his work with King Crimson..."

Track listing 

All tracks written by Adrian Belew.

"Of Bow and Drum" – (4:34)
"Word Play Drum Beat" – (1:31)
"Six String" – (3:30)
"Conversation Piece" – (1:10)
"All Her Love Is Mine" – (4:28)
"I Remember How To Forget" – (3:53)
"What Do You Know (Part I)" – (1:01)
"Op Zop Too Wah" – (3:42)
"A Plate of Words" – (0:50)
"Time Waits" – (3:09)
"What Do You Know (Part II)" – (1:11)
"Modern Man Hurricane Blues" – (3:42)
"In My Backyard" – (0:56)
"A Plate of Guitar" – (0:47)
"Live in a Tree" – (1:05)
"Something to Do" – (2:40)
"Beautiful" – (2:49)
"High Wire Guitar" – (3:43)
"Sky Blue Red Bird Green House" – (3:03)
"The Ruin After the Rain" – (3:51)
"On" – (4:19)

Personnel

Musicians
 Adrian Belew – guitars, piano, bass guitar, synthesizers, samplers, electronics, vocals
 Martha Belew, Sherry Webb, Iris Belew, Ken Latchney, Stan Hertzman – voices (2)

Technical
 Adrian Belew – producer, artwork, design
 Noah Evens – engineer
 Ken Latchney  – engineer
 Glenn Meadows – mastering engineer
 Anna Valencia – art direction
 Grant Lovett – photography

References 

1996 albums
Concept albums
Adrian Belew albums
Albums produced by Adrian Belew